Vitkovo is a village in the municipality of Aleksandrovac, Serbia. According to the 2002 census, the village has a population of 488 people.

In 2019, a 6000 years old Venus figurine was found at a nearby archeological site.

References

Populated places in Rasina District